Bellechasse—Etchemins—Montmagny—L'Islet (formerly known as Bellechasse—Montmagny—L'Islet) was a federal electoral district in Quebec, Canada, that was represented in the House of Commons of Canada from 1997 to 2004.

It was created as "Bellechasse—Montmagny—L'Islet" in 1996 from Bellechasse electoral district. It was renamed "Bellechasse—Etchemins—Montmagny—L'Islet" in 1997. It was abolished in 2003 when it was redistributed into Lévis—Bellechasse and Rivière-du-Loup—Montmagny ridings.

The district consisted of the cities of L'Islet, Lac-Etchemin, Montmagny and Saint-Pamphile, the Regional County Municipalities of Bellechasse, L'Islet, Montmagny and Les Etchemins (except the municipalities of Saint-Benjamin, Saint-Prosper, Saint-Zacharie and Sainte-Aurélie).

Members of Parliament

This riding elected only one Member of Parliament:

Normand won the 1997 election narrowly over François Langlois of the Bloc Québécois, but beat him in 2000 handily.

Election results

See also 

 List of Canadian federal electoral districts
 Past Canadian electoral districts

External links

Riding history from the Library of Parliament
Bellechasse—Montmagny—L'Islet
Bellechasse—Etchemins—Montmagny—L'Islet

Former federal electoral districts of Quebec
Montmagny, Quebec